The American Studies Association (ASA) is a scholarly organization founded in 1951.  It is the oldest scholarly organization devoted to the interdisciplinary study of U.S. culture and history. The ASA works to promote meaningful dialogue about the United States of America, throughout the U.S. and across the globe. Its purpose is to support scholars and scholarship committed to original research, innovative and effective teaching, critical thinking, and public discussion and debate.

The ASA consists of almost 5,000 individual members along with 2,200 library and other institutional subscribers. It publishes the journal American Quarterly at Johns Hopkins University Press.  The concerns and activities of the organization are international in scope.

History

The American Studies Association was founded for purposes of
the promotion of the study of American culture through the encouragement of research, teaching, publication, the strengthening of relations among persons and institutions in this country and abroad devoted to such studies, and the broadening of knowledge among the general public about American culture in all its diversity and complexity.

American Studies departments, programs, and centers exist around the world.

Officers and governance

Past Presidents of the ASA include Carl Bode (1951–52), Daniel J. Boorstin (1969), Daniel Aaron (1972–73), William H. Goetzmann (1974–75), Janice Radway (1998–99). Recent presidents have included: Curis Marez,  Lisa Duggan, David Roediger, Robert Warrior, Kandice Chuh,  Roderick Ferguson, and Scott Kurashige (2019-2020).

Membership

Membership is available to any individual with an interest in the study of American culture.   Colleges, universities, museums, foundations, societies and other institutions can also be members of the ASA.

Chapters
The ASA includes thirteen chapters:

The American Studies Association of Texas
The California American Studies Association
The Chesapeake American Studies Association 
The Eastern American Studies Association 
The Great Lakes American Studies Association
The Hawaii American Studies Association 
The Kentucky-Tennessee American Studies Association
The Mid-America American Studies Association 
The New England American Studies Association 
The New York Metro American Studies Association 
The Pacific Northwest American Studies Association
The Rocky Mountain American Studies Association
The Southern American Studies Association

Publications
The ASA regularly produces several publications including:
The American Quarterly (AQ): Published in March, June, September, and December, the Journal's essays engage with important issues in American studies.  It is available online to ASA members and through Project MUSE and JSTOR.
The ASA E-Newsletter: Published quarterly, this newsletter provides information on programs, publications and opportunities relevant to ASA members, while aiming to promote a broader awareness of the challenges facing the American Studies Community.
The Encyclopedia of American Studies: An online database featuring over 750 searchable articles. The ASA claims that the "Encyclopedia of American Studies is the leading reference work for the field."

Annual meetings

The annual ASA meeting features speakers and workshops connected to a broad theme important to the field. The 2022 meeting will be held from November 3-6 in New Orleans, Louisiana under the theme of "The Roof is on Fire." Recent meetings have been held in Honolulu, Hawaii; San Juan, Puerto Rico; Baltimore, Maryland; Atlanta, Georgia; Chicago, Illinois; Denver, Colorado; Toronto, Canada; Los Angeles, California.

Prizes and grants
The ASA awards a number of prizes and grants including:
Constance Rourke Prize for the best article in American Quarterly
Wise-Susman Prize for the best student paper at the annual meeting
Yasuo Sakakibara Prize for the best paper presented by a scholar at the annual meeting
Ralph Henry Gabriel Prize for the best dissertation in American Studies
Lora Romero First Book Publication Prize
John Hope Franklin Best Book Publication Prize
Angela Y. Davis Prize for public scholarship
Mary C. Turpie Prize for teaching, advising and program development in American Studies
Carl Bode-Norman Holmes Pearson Prize for outstanding contributions to American Studies.

Boycott of Israeli academic institutions 

In December 2013, members of ASA voted to join the boycott of all Israeli educational institutions. It was the first time a major American scholarly organization to undertake a boycott of Israel. ASA was strongly criticized and four ASA members, aided by the pro-Israeli Brandeis Center, even sued the organization. As of 2020, the boycott is ongoing.

References

External links
Native American and Indigenous Studies Association
 Official site
 Website of American Quarterly
Kentucky-Tennessee American Studies Association Records, 1958-1998, Tennessee State Library and Archives.

Educational organizations based in the United States